Artabrus is a genus of jumping spiders with only two species. The type species, Artabrus erythrocephalus, was described in 1846 by C. L. Koch as Plexippus erythrocephalus and transferred to his new genus Artabrus by Eugène Simon in 1902. It remained the only species in the genus until a second species was described in 2020.

This genus resembles Epeus in body shape and eye pattern, but has a different genital structure. It is said to be close to Pseudamycus.

Species
, the World Spider Catalog accepted two species:
 Artabrus aurantipilosus Hurni-Cranston & Hill, 2020 – Banda Islands
 Artabrus erythrocephalus (C. L. Koch, 1846) – Java, Singapore

References

Further reading
 Zabka, M. & Nentwig, W. (2002), "The Krakatau Islands (Indonesia) as a model-area for zoogeographical study, a Salticidae (Arachnida: Araneae) perspective", Annales zoologici 52(3), 465-474, PDF

External links
 Salticidae.org: Diagnostic drawings and photograph of A. erythrocephalus

Salticidae
Salticidae genera